Aizawl is the capital of the state of Mizoram in India. Aizawl was officially established on 25 February 1890. With a population of 293,416, it is the largest city in the state. It is also the centre of administration containing all the important government offices, state assembly house and civil secretariat. The population of Aizawl strongly reflects the different communities of the ethnic Mizo people.

History 
In 1871–72, the disorderly conduct of Khalkom, a Mizo chief, compelled the British to establish an outpost that later became the Aizawl village.
The post had been established by Suakpuilala, the Chief of Reiek and it was only 14 kilometres from Sairang from where one could travel by flat bottomed boat. In 1890, officer Dally of the Assam Police and his 400 men arrived at Aizawl to support Colonel Skinner's troops during a British military operation against the Mizo tribals. On Dally's recommendation, Aizawl was selected as the site of a fortified post that Colonel Skinner had been ordered to construct. The troops constructed stockades and buildings at the site. In 1892-95 Aizawl became accessible from Silchar by fair weather road under the supervision of Major Loch.

The Indian Air Force carried out air strikes on the town during the March 1966 Mizo National Front uprising, following which the MNF withdrew to Lunglei. Until 1966, Aizawl was a large village but the regrouping of Mizo villages after the uprising made it become a larger town and then a city. Aizawl has become the centre of road network in Mizoram connecting the north and south, east and west. More than 25% of the Mizoram population reside in Aizawl.

Geography
Aizawl is located in north of the Tropic of Cancer in the northern part of Mizoram. It is situated on a ridge 1,132 metres (3715 ft) above sea level, with the Tlawng river valley to its west and the Tuirial river valley to its east.

Civic Administration

The Aizawl Municipal Council is the authority of civic administration of Aizawl city. It was formed in 2010 with 19 Members when the Congress-ZNP party coalition was voted to power in the state legislative assembly. The AMC office is being administered by one council Chairman, Vice-Chairman and three executive members. It consists of 19 elected members representing 19 wards of the city and others appointed by the Governor of Mizoram. One-third of the total membership is reserved for women, these six seats shall be rotated after every five years. The tenure of the council is five years. There is a Ward Committee in every ward that consists of a Chairman, who is an elected councillor from that ward, and two members each from all the local council within the ward. There are 78 local councils having a term of five years.

Demographics

As of 1910, there were 777 army personnel in Aizawl from different parts of North India as well as Nepal. The Gurkha's among the soldiers eventually settled in Aizawl.

As of the 2011 Census of India, Aizawl had a population of 293,416. Females constitute 50.61% of the population and males made up the remaining 49.39%. Mizos from various tribes make up the majority of the population. Christianity forms majority of the city population about 93.63%. Other minority religions are Hinduism 4.14, Islam 1.52, Buddhism 0.45, Others 0.09%, Sikhism 0.03% and Jainism 0.02%. 0.11% peoples did not state their religion. 

Presbyterians make up the majority of the population. However, there are also significant numbers of the Salvation Army, Baptists, Seventh-day Adventists, United Pentecostal Church and Roman Catholics in the city. There are also some cultural based Christian sects. Hinduism and Islam are also represented in very small numbers in the city population.

Climate

Aizawl has a mild, sub-tropical climate due to its location and elevation. Under the Köppen climate classification, Aizawl features a humid subtropical climate (Cwa). Rainfall is mostly concentrated between April and October, with the heaviest rainfall occurring in May, July, August and September. The remainder of the year is notably drier.

Cityscape

Economy
The economy of Aizawl is basically sustained by government services as it is capital of Mizoram. The major banks are also located within Aizawl.
A 3-star category hotel, Hotel Regency, has recently been inaugurated at Zarkawt, a central location within the city. It provides a much-needed hospitality service for tourists and business visitors to Aizawl. There are several other hotels apart from Hotel Regency. Those include - Hotel Sangchia located in Zarkawt, Hotel Grand located in Zarkawt, Hotel Floria located in Dawrpui, Ritz Hotel located in Canteen Kual, Tourist Lodge located in Chaltlang, Chawlhna Hotel located in Zarkawt, Riakmaw Inn located in Zarkawt, Hotel Ahimsa located in Zarkawt, and other numerous affordable hotels.

Transport

Air

Aizawl is connected by air transport through Lengpui Airport which it is situated near Aizawl. The airport provides connectivity to Kolkata, Delhi, Guwahati, Agartala, Shillong and Imphal, operated by Air India, Go First and IndiGo. A helicopter service by Pawan Hans was started in 2012 and connects the city with Lunglei, Lawngtlai, Saiha, Chawngte, Serchhip, Champhai, Kolasib, Khawzawl, Ngopa and Hnahthial.

Rail
Mizoram is connected by railroad up to Bairabi, there are plans to connect Bairabi with Sairang with broad gauge railway track, near Aizawl. The government has also started a broad gauge Bairabi Sairang Railway connection for better connectivity in the state. There is also the plan for 5 km long Aizawl Monorail running between Zemabawk to Kulikawn.

Road
Aizawl is connected by road with Silchar through National Highway 540, with Agartala through National Highway 40 and with Imphal through National Highway 150. The yellow-and-white taxis are widely available; Maruti cars are most widely used. Privately owned blue-and-white mini buses are on regular service as city buses.. For local conveyance 2 wheeler taxi are also available.

Media
Newspaper: The major media in Aizawl in Mizo and English Language are:

 Vanglaini,
 The Zozam Times
 The Aizawl Post.
 Khawpui Aw
 Virthli
 The Mizoram Post
 Zoram Tlangau
 Mizo Arsi
 Mizo Express
 Zawlaidi
 Zozam Weekly
 Zoram Thlirtu
 Sakeibaknei
 Entlang

Radio:
All India Radio also has a studio that host programmes at scheduled hours. FM Zoawi is a popular radio station in Aizawl.

Education

There are both state and private schools. Parochial schools are run by the Baptist Church of Mizoram, the Presbyterian Church of India (Synod), several Roman Catholic (St. Paul's Higher Secondary School, Mary Mount School, St. Lawrence School, St. Mary's School) religious orders and the Seventh-day Adventists (Helen Lowry). Kendriya Vidyalaya, Aizawl, is another school run by the Kendriya Vidyalaya Sangathan, the school situated close to Zembawk. Other schools include Home Missions School, Mount Carmel School, Oikos Higher Secondary School.

Tertiary
Pachhunga University College was among the earliest colleges founded in 1958. Aizawl College, the second oldest college in Aizawl City was established in the year 1975. Hrangbana College was established in 1980, located in Chanmari, Aizawl, it has 57 teaching staffs with 22 non-teaching staffs and more than 2,000 students in commerce and arts departments. Mizoram University established in 2001 provides affiliation to all the colleges in Mizoram. Mizoram University also provides post-graduate education as well as B.Tech education and other departments. ICFAI University, Mizoram located in Durtlang, Aizawl West College, Government Aizawl North College, J. Thankima College also provides undergraduate courses. Mizoram Law College provides education to people who seek profession in Law. Indian Institute of Mass Communication and National Institute of Technology Mizoram has already started operations. Zoram Medical College is inaugurated on 7 August 2018 in Falkawn.

Sports

Football is the most popular sport in Mizoram with a number of footballers playing in national leagues in different parts of India. Some of the more important playing facilities in Aizawl are:
 Rajiv Gandhi Stadium Mualpui, with a seating capacity of 20,000, is currently being constructed at Mualpui, Aizawl.
 Hawla Indoor Stadium is the largest indoor stadium with basketball, badminton and boxing facilities.
 Lammual stadium is a single tier stadium. The stadium under construction will have a seating capacity of about 5,000 spectators.

Aizawl hosted the third edition of Xchange North East Youth NGO summit from October 3 to 5, 2018.

Neighbourhoods

 Aizawl Venglai
 Armed Veng
 Bawngkawn South/Chhim Veng 
 Bethlehem
 Bethlehem Vengthlang
 Bungkawn
 Bungkawn Vengthar
 Central Jail Veng
 Chaltlang
 Chaltlang North/Lily Veng
 Chawlhhmun
 Chanmari 
 Chanmari West
 Chawnpui 
 Chhinga Veng
 Chite Veng
 College Veng
 Dam Veng
 Dawrpui
 Dawrpui Vengthar
 Dinthar 
 Durtlang
 Durtlang Leitan
 Durtlang North
 Electric Veng
 Edenthar 
 Hunthar
 Hlimen
 I.T.I. Veng
 Kanan 
 Khatla 
 Khatla East
 Khatla South
 Khatla West (New Secretariat Complex)
 Kulikawn 
 Laipuitlang
 Lawipu Veng
 Luangmual
 Maubawk
 Melthum
 Mission Veng
 Mission Vengthlang
 Muanna Veng 
 Nursery
 Phunchawng 

 Ramhlun Venglai
 Ramhlun North
 Ramhlun South
 Ramhlun Vengthar
 Ramhlun Sports Complex
 Ramthar
 Ramthar North
 Rangvamual
 Republic Veng
 Republic Vengthlang
 Saikhamakawn
 Sakawrtuichhun
 Salem Veng
 Saron
 Selesih
 Tanhril 
 Thakthing 
 Tlangnuam
 Tlangnuam South
 Tuikhuahtlang
 Tuikual South
 Tuikual North
 Tuithiang
 Tuivamit 
 Upper Republic
 Vaivakawn 
 Venghlui
 Venghnuai
 Zarkawt
 Zemabawk
 Zemabawk North 
 Zonuam 
 Zotlang 
 Zuangtui

Notable people

See also
 Tourism in North East India
 Advanced Research Centre for Bamboo and Rattan Aizawl

References

External links

 Aizawl Official Website

 
Hill stations in Mizoram
Cities and towns in Aizawl district
Populated places established in 1890
Tourism in Northeast India
1890 establishments in India